"I'm Getting High Remembering" is a single by Canadian country music artist Carroll Baker written by Ray Griff. Released in 1979, it was the second single from her 1978 album If It Wasn't for You. The song reached number one on the RPM Country Tracks chart in Canada in May 1979.  The song was initially recorded by Narvel Felts in 1976 and then by Bobby Lewis the following year.

Chart performance

References

1979 singles
Carroll Baker songs
RCA Records singles
1979 songs
Songs written by Ray Griff